Christ the King is a title sometimes given to Jesus Christ.

Churches

Antigua 

 Christ the King High School, St. John's, Antigua

Belgium 

 , parish church originally built for the 1930 World's Fair, Antwerp

Canada 

 Cathedral Basilica of Christ the King, Hamilton, Ontario
 Christ the King Cathedral, Gaspé, Quebec
 Christ the King College, London, Ontario

Ireland 

 Christ the King Cathedral, Mullingar – First cathedral in the world to be dedicated under that title

Italy 

 Institute of Christ the King Sovereign Priest, a Roman Catholic Society of Apostolic Life

Malta 

 Basilica of Christ the King, Paola

Philippines  

 Christ The King Chapel, Las Piñas City, Philippines
 Christ The King Parish, Sapang Palay, San Juan Del Monte City, Bulacan, Philippines 
 Christ The King Parish Church, Greenmeadows, Ugong, Quezon City, Metro Manila, Philippines

Portugal 

 Christ the King monument and sanctuary, with annex seminary, in Almada

Spain

United Kingdom 

 The Metropolitan Cathedral of Christ the King, Liverpool
 The Church of Christ the King, Bloomsbury, London
 Christ the King Catholic High School, Southport

United States 

 Christ the King Roman Catholic Church and School, Denver, Colorado
 Cathedral of Christ the King, Atlanta, Georgia
 Christ the King Baptist Church, Dacula, Georgia
 Christ the King Chapel, St. Ambrose University, Davenport, Iowa
 Cathedral of Christ the King (Lexington, Kentucky)
 Christ the King Catholic Church, Silver Spring, Maryland 
 Christ the King Presbyterian Church, Cambridge, Massachusetts
 Christ the King Seminary, Diocese of Buffalo, East Aurora, New York 
 Christ the King Episcopal Church, Stone Ridge, New York
 Christ the King Church, Eugene, Oregon
 Christ the King Presbyterian Church, Houston, Texas
 Cathedral of Christ the King (Lubbock, Texas)
 Christ The King Church & School, Seattle, Washington

References

Christ the King